Lime Pictures, formerly known as Mersey Television, is a British television production company, founded by producer and writer Phil Redmond in the early 1980s. They produce award winning drama, and entertainment shows, for the international market including Hollyoaks, The Only Way is Essex, Geordie Shore and Free Rein.

Mersey Television productions

Mersey Television's first major production was the soap opera Brookside for Channel 4, which ran from the channel's foundation in 1982 until 2003, when it was taken off air due to declining ratings. A 3-part spin-off ('soap bubble') of Brookside was produced in November 1987 called Damon and Debbie.

In 1995, the company began producing a second soap opera for Channel 4, Hollyoaks, which still runs.

Both Brookside and Hollyoaks were created by Redmond himself, and in 2003 the company took over production of another series he had created, the children's drama Grange Hill, which had first been broadcast on BBC1 in 1978 and had been made in-house by the BBC until Mersey Television took over. The company moved production of the series to their Liverpool base, with the fictional school no longer being established as in London but instead an unspecified UK location.

North West Television franchise bid
In 1991 Mersey Television under the name of North West Television made an audacious bid during the ITV network franchise auction to win the Channel 3 licence in the North West England from holders Granada Television. Granada had held the North West franchise ever since the inception of independent television in the 1950s, and Granada was one of the biggest and the most established of the ITV companies. Granada was also a popular production company and it came second only to the BBC to find the most respected British television company amongst the British public.

The bid was supported financially by Yorkshire Television and Tyne Tees Television and the bid had aimed to provide a more balanced television service for the North West, in particular featuring more content from Liverpool as opposed to Manchester. However, although North West Television bid more money for the franchise totalling £35 million as opposed to Granada's £9 million, the licence stayed with Granada as the Independent Television Commission declared that the Mersey Television bid did not meet the required quality threshold.

Furthermore, Granada were aware of Mersey Television's attempts to gain the North West franchise and built defences to avoid the loss of the licence they had owned for decades. New franchises which had no experience of owning an ITV franchise (Mersey Television was one such example) would have to a pass a "quality hurdle" that Granada executives actually helped the ITC adopt. Granada also had a well known catalogue of productions including Prime Suspect, Cracker, World in Action and Coronation Street and if Mersey Television had gained the franchise, then Granada would have sold these to satellite television. It did not happen.

Lime Pictures
Mersey Television was bought by All3Media in June 2005 and, in a contractual requirement, renamed Lime Pictures in 2006. Since then the company has produced the following series:

 In 2007, Lime Pictures produced an eight-part series called Living on the Edge, documenting the real lives of a group of teenagers in Cheshire, which was shown on MTV.
 In 2007, they produced the short-lived ITV sitcom Bonkers.
 In 2008, they produced the first (and so far, only) series of Apparitions, starring Martin Shaw as an exorcist.
 In 2009, they produced the BBC Switch reality drama The Season filmed in Val-d'Isère.
 In 2010, Lime Pictures produced a pilot episode for the E4 sitcom Sex and the Chippy, written by Heather Robson and Neil Jones.
 Since 2010, Lime Pictures have produced the award-winning reality series The Only Way Is Essex for ITV2.
 Through 2011 to 2013, Lime Pictures, along with Nickelodeon Productions and Studio 100, produced House of Anubis, which aired on Nickelodeon.
 From 2011 to 2022, Lime Pictures produced Geordie Shore for MTV in the UK and Ireland.
 From 2011 to 2014, Lime Pictures produced Rocket's Island for CBBC.
 From 2014 to 2016, The Evermoor Chronicles were produced for Disney Channel.
 Since 2016, Lime Pictures have produced Celebs Go Dating for E4.
 In 2017, they began producing Free Rein for Netflix.

 In 2021, they produced Hollyoaks IRL for Channel 4. The series has been nominated for a BAFTA TV award, in the Short-form programme category.

Awards and nominations

References

External links
Official website
Conker Media
All3Media
Hollyoaks website
Grange Hill website (archived)

All3Media
Companies based in Liverpool
Mass media companies established in 1982
Television production companies of the United Kingdom
2005 mergers and acquisitions